The Jamaican oriole (Icterus leucopteryx) is a species of bird in the family Icteridae.

Distribution
It is found in Jamaica and on the Colombian island of San Andrés. The subspecies I. l. bairdi formerly occurred on Grand Cayman in the Cayman Islands but is now extinct, making the species extirpated there.

Taxonomy
The species is more closely related to the orioles of the North American mainland, such as the Baltimore oriole (Icterus galbula), and the orange oriole (Icterus auratus) than to the other Caribbean members of the genus.

Habitat
Its natural habitats are subtropical or tropical moist lowland forests, subtropical or tropical moist montane forests, and heavily degraded former forest.

References

Jamaican oriole
Birds of Jamaica
Birds of Colombia
Jamaican oriole
Taxonomy articles created by Polbot